Cándido Carrera (born 24 March 1980) is a Spanish rallying co-driver. He is set to partner with Dani Sordo for Hyundai Motorsport in the World Rally Championship category.

Rally career
Carrera made his WRC debut at the 2010 Rally Catalunya. In July 2021, three-time rally winner Dani Sordo announced Carrera as his new co-driver, replacing compatriot Borja Rozada.

Rally results

WRC results

* Season still in progress.

References

External links

 Cándido Carrera's e-wrc profile

1980 births
Living people
Spanish rally co-drivers
World Rally Championship co-drivers